Dashinchilen is a sum (district) of Bulgan Province in northern Mongolia. The population is about 2,300.

Notable people
Sonomyn Udval (1921-1991) -politician and writer

Districts of Bulgan Province